'Parliamentary elections were held in Kosovo on 17 November 2007 alongside Municipal elections. Voters elected the 120 members of the unicameral Assembly, the legislative branch of the Provisional Institutions of Self-Government that the United Nations Interim Administration Mission in Kosovo created. The elections were scheduled by the Special Representative of the Secretary-General of the United Nations, Joachim Rücker (head of the UNMIK) on 1 September 2007.

Results
Of the ten seats reserved for Serbs, six were won by four parties which decided to form a coalition on 5 December: Slaviša Petković's Serb Democratic Party of Kosovo and Metohija, Dragiša Mirić's Serb Kosovo-Metohija Party, Mihajl Šćepanović's Serb People's Party and Nebojša Živić's Union of Independent Social Democrats of Kosovo and Metohija.

References

Elections in Kosovo
Parliamentary
Kosovo
November 2007 events in Europe